Mountjoy Prison, founded as Mountjoy Gaol and nicknamed The Joy, is a medium security men's prison located in Phibsborough in the centre of Dublin, Ireland.
The current prison Governor is Edward Mullins.

History

Mountjoy was designed by Captain Joshua Jebb of the Royal Engineers and opened in 1850. It was based on the design of London's Pentonville Prison also designed by Jebb. Originally intended as the first stop for men sentenced to transportation, they would spend a period in separate confinement before being transferred to Spike Island and transported from there to Van Diemen's Land.

A total of 46 prisoners (including one woman, Annie Walsh) were executed within the walls of the prison, prior to the abolition of capital punishment. Executions were carried out by hanging and firing squads, after which the bodies of the dead were taken down from the gallows and buried within the prison grounds in unmarked graves. The list of Irish republican prisoners executed at Mountjoy Prison includes:

Kevin Barry
Patrick Moran
Frank Flood
Thomas Whelan
Thomas Traynor
Patrick Doyle
Thomas Bryan
Bernard Ryan
Edmond Foley
Patrick Maher
Rory O'Connor
Joe McKelvey
Liam Mellows
Richard Barrett
Thomas Harte 
Patrick McGrath
Maurice O'Neill
Charlie Kerins
Annie Walsh from Limerick, who was found guilty of murdering her husband, was executed in Mountjoy prison on 5 August 1925. She remains the only woman ever executed by the Irish State which was founded in 1922.

On 13 October 1923 Irish Republican prisoners in Mountjoy Prison began the 1923 Irish Hunger Strikes, protesting being interned without charges or trial and poor prison conditions. Close to 500 men began the hunger strike in Mountjoy and the strike quickly spread to other camps and prisons with over 5,000 prisoners taking part nationwide.
Andy O'Sullivan, from County Cavan, died on hunger strike on 23 November 1923 in Mountjoy Prison.

After being convicted of murdering a Garda officer, Charlie Kerins, former Chief of Staff to the Anti-Treaty IRA, was hanged at Mountjoy Prison on 1 December 1944.

The last execution carried out in the Republic of Ireland, that of Michael Manning, took place in Mountjoy Prison on 20 April 1954.

Some Irish leaders involved with the Irish War of Independence and Irish Civil War were held there. On 14 May 1921, an IRA team led by Paddy Daly and Emmet Dalton mounted an attempt to rescue Sean McEoin from the prison. They used a captured armoured car to gain access to Mountjoy, but were discovered and had to shoot their way out.

The Fenian poet, author of the popular song "Rising of the Moon", John Keegan 'Leo' Casey was imprisoned here during the 1860s; subsequently in the 20th century playwright and IRA activist Brendan Behan was also gaoled within.

On 31 October 1973, it was the scene of a spectacular escape by a hijacked helicopter by three Provisional Irish Republican Army prisoners, including Seamus Twomey and J.B O'Hagan.

By 2006, a 60-hectare site had been acquired for €30 million at Thornton Hall, Fingal, where a replacement for Mountjoy was to be constructed. The new facility was intended to accommodate 1,400 prisoners. The site was planned to include court facilities, video-conference links, medical and therapeutic facilities, but due to government cutbacks these plans have now been sidelined.

Incidents
In August 2006, prisoners who were normally separated from the rest of the population for safety were mixed together for a night with mentally ill inmate Stephen Egan. Prisoner Gary Douche was killed by Egan who was found not guilty of murder due to a lack of responsibility. This prompted the Minister of Justice to seek a limit of 520 inmates on the capacity of the prison.

In October 2010, the prison was placed under lockdown after a night of violence and rioting involving more than 70 inmates. It started when a number of prisoners attacked three prison officers with pool cues and balls during recreation. Reinforcements were brought in from around Dublin to quell the riot and a number of Alsatians dogs from the riot unit were also deployed.

In 2016, figures were released showing that Mountjoy Prison saw a disproportionate number of prisoners hospitalised due to assaults and self-harm. In response, the Irish Penal Reform Trust said the "ongoing levels of violence and intimidation in Irish prisons, particularly in Mountjoy Prison, must be addressed".

Composition

Main Prison
Mountjoy Prison is constructed along a radial design with four main wings, A through D, each of which have three landings, as well as an underground basement landing. The wings are connected to a central circle, known simply as 'the circle'. When originally built in 1850 it had 500 cells each of which was designed for single capacity. Many parts of the original building have either been renovated or destroyed.  At the time of the 2009 inspection, there were 371 cells in the main unit of the prison. These are the original cells which were built in 1850 for single occupancy. Their size varies from 3.91m x 2.06m to 3.43m x 2.06m. The prison was built with in-cell sanitation but this was removed in 1939 when it was deemed that 'prisoners were using too much water'. However, all cells in the main jail have in-cell sanitation following refurbishment in the period 2010 to 2015. These cells contain a toilet, a sink, a television and a small kettle.

Facilities in the prison include gymnasiums, computer classes, carpentry, masonry and a wide variety of school activities such as music, drama and cookery. Prisoners can undertake to complete academic exams in the school such as Junior Certificate, Leaving Certificate and even Open University. Additionally, there is an on-site kitchen and bakery where trusted inmates are given employment under supervision.

Medical Unit
The Medical Unit, otherwise referred to as the drug detoxification unit, is a three storied structure. It provides accommodation for sixty prisoners in forty-eight single person cells and three cells that can accommodate up to four people. All the cells in this unit have in-cell sanitation facilities. It is equipped with medical facilities, classrooms and kitchen facilities. The Inspector of Prisons reported in 2009 that this unit was bright and clean and did not suffer from overcrowding.

Controlled Behavioural Unit
The Controlled Behavioural Unit, known as the CBU or the Block, is used for unruly prisoners or those on punishment and is located in the 'D' Base, underneath the D wing. This includes 24-hour lock-up, with the exception of one hour of open air exercise, and no integration with other inmates.

Separation Unit
The Separation Unit had 35 cells. It also had kitchen facilities a shower block and a laundry. In the late 1980s, inmates diagnosed with HIV or AIDS were housed in the separation unit. This policy was brought to an end on 1 January 1995. Following the unit's refurbishment in 1997, all cells had in-cell sanitation. The separation unit was closed indefinitely in 2014 following an inspection by the Inspector of Prisons.

Mountjoy Campus
The Mountjoy Campus is home to three other separate penal facilities.

Dóchas Centre
St. Patrick's Institution
Training Unit

People associated with Mountjoy
A former governor was Charles Arthur Munro, brother of the Edwardian satirist Saki.

The schizophrenic French surrealist playwright Antonin Artaud was briefly detained in Mountjoy before his deportation from Ireland as "a destitute and undesirable alien".

Thomas Ashe was also a former inmate of the jail for his involvement in the Easter rising 1916. After a protest of starvation he was transferred across the street to the Mater Misericordiae Hospital on 25 September 1916 where he died a few hours after arrival.

Peadar O'Donnell, IRA Commander of the 2nd Northern Division was imprisoned in Mountjoy Gaol and the Curragh. Following the end of the Irish Civil War, he participated in the mass republican hunger strike (1923 Irish Hunger Strikes), remaining on hunger strike for 41 days. O'Donnell's prison experience and eventual escape in March 1924, are described in his 1932 memoir The Gates Flew Open.

Bibliography 
Carey, Tim : Mountjoy – The Story of a Prison :The Collins Press : 2000 :

See also 
Prisons in Ireland
Loughan House, a low security open centre in Co. Cavan also run by the Irish Prison Service.
Kilmainham Gaol, a former prison, located in Kilmainham in Dublin, which is now a museum.
Executions during the Irish Civil War

References

External links

Mountjoy Prison
Minister announces site for new Mountjoy complex — from the official Irish Prison Service website
Inspector-General of Prisons and Places of Detention, 3rd Annual Report – 2005
Mountjoy Prison Visiting Committee 2004 Annual Report
Mountjoy Prison Portraits of Irish Independence: Photograph Albums in the Thomas A. Larcom Collection

Buildings and structures in Dublin (city)
Prisons in the Republic of Ireland
1850 establishments in Ireland